Ali Dad (born 1964) is an Afghan former wrestler, who competed at the 1988 Summer Olympic Games in the featherweight event, but was suspended after testing positive in a doping test for diuretics.

References

External links
 

Wrestlers at the 1988 Summer Olympics
Afghan male sport wrestlers
Olympic wrestlers of Afghanistan
Afghan sportspeople in doping cases
Doping cases in wrestling
1964 births
Living people
Place of birth missing (living people)